Jorge Antonio Méndez Castillo (born 6 April 2001) is a Panamanian footballer who plays as a left winger for Once Caldas.

Career

Universitario
Méndez began his senior career with CD Universitario in his native Panama, making his league debut for the club on 12 February 2017 in a 1–0 victory over Árabe Unido.

DAC Dunajská Streda
In September 2019, Méndez moved to Slovak club DAC on a two-year loan. During his loan, Méndez had also appeared with DAC's 2. Liga affiliate ŠTK Šamorín. In January 2021, Méndez requested his release from the club due to family reasons with the intent to continue his career in Panama.

References

External links

1999 births
Living people
Panamanian footballers
Panamanian expatriate footballers
Panama youth international footballers
Sportspeople from Panama City
Association football defenders
Unión Deportivo Universitario players
FC DAC 1904 Dunajská Streda players
Liga Panameña de Fútbol players
Slovak Super Liga players
Panamanian expatriate sportspeople in Slovakia
Expatriate footballers in Slovakia